Eva Elizabeth "Eve" McVeagh (July 15, 1919 – December 10, 1997) was an American actress of film, television, stage, and radio. Her career spanned 52 years from her first stage role through her last stage appearance. Her roles included leading and supporting parts as well as smaller character roles in which she proved a gifted character actress.

Early life
Born in Cincinnati, Ohio to Hugh McVeagh, a railroad clerk, and Eva E. Johnson, she moved to Los Angeles in 1923 with her widowed mother and maternal grandmother, Molly Johnson, where she started acting in theater in her teens.

Stage

Following stage success in Hollywood, McVeagh moved to New York City in her 20s, performing on radio and on Broadway in several productions including the roles of Martha in Snafu (1944–1945) and Patsy Laverne in Too Hot for Maneuvers (1945). After the well received Broadway run of Snafu, McVeagh took over the female lead at The National Theater in Washington DC in 1945.

In 1947, McVeagh played a supporting role opposite Billie Burke and Grant Mitchell in the original play Accidentally Yours. The production received very favorable reviews on the West Coast and was en route to New York where it was predicted to be the "comedy smash hit of 1948". However, the production was not a commercial success and never made it to Broadway. Ms McVeagh did not perform on Broadway again, but after returning to Los Angeles, and working in film and television for years, she traveled back to New York to perform in the play Scuba Duba in 1971.

After this stage work, McVeagh traveled back to her home base in Los Angeles. She starred in West Coast premieres of Broadway shows at the Pasadena Playhouse, most notably the lead in Come Back Little Sheba. Her Hollywood theater work included one year as Martha in Who's Afraid of Virginia Woolf?

Her stage career continued in Las Vegas in 1981 in The Ninety Day Mistress, playing the mother of June Wilkinson's character. She continued to act in small stage productions including several with the award-winning Theatre Forty Company in Beverly Hills. In Hollywood, her final role was as a member of a lesbian couple in 1989 concluding an over 50 year stage career.

Film

McVeagh's first film appearance was a supporting role in the classic High Noon (1952) in which she played Mildred Fuller alongside Gary Cooper and Grace Kelly.  In the early 1950s she was under contract with Columbia Pictures.  During that time, she co-starred in Tight Spot as Clara Moran playing the sister of Ginger Rogers: Of her performance, The New York Times raved "For our money, the best scene, whipped up by scenarist William Bowers, is the anything-but-tender reunion of Miss Rogers and her sister, Eve McVeagh ... an ugly, blistering pip."  Ms. McVeagh was also featured opposite Richard Widmark and Lauren Bacall in The Cobweb as Shirley Irwin.  She starred as Viv in The Glass Web, and was featured as Mrs. Clinton in Three in the Attic, Mrs. Masters in The Way West, Mrs. Griggs in Crime & Punishment, USA, a reporter in the Dino De Laurentiis production of King Kong, and The Graduate. Her final co-starring film role was in the independent film Money to Burn (1983) as Vivian.  Her last onscreen appearance was a cameo role in Creator (1985) with Peter O'Toole. Ms. McVeagh's contributions to film were recognized by the bestowal of full voting membership in the actor's branch of the Academy of Motion Picture Arts and Sciences in September 1974. Her contributions in film spanned 33 years.

Television

McVeagh's career in television began in 1946 as a primary cast member in the first American network Soap Opera, Faraway Hill.  Other notable early television series on which she guest starred included Dragnet and I Love Lucy (as Lucy's hairdresser, Roberta, in the classic "Black Wig" episode). She was featured in three episodes of Perry Mason and two episodes of The Twilight Zone, and was a regular guest on The Johnny Carson Show. Alfred Hitchcock notably hired actors he liked regularly. McVeagh was featured in four episodes of Alfred Hitchcock Presents and two episodes of The Alfred Hitchcock Hour ("Last Seen Wearing Blue Jeans" in 1963). She co-starred on the Hitchcock-directed episode, "Incident at a Corner", of the television series Startime (pictured).  Roles in the 1960s also included Frances Moseby, a series regular, on The Clear Horizon, a recurring character, Miss Hammond, on Petticoat Junction, as well as roles on Bonanza, Ironside and My Three Sons. Continuing in the 1970s, she appeared in the 1972 television movie  "The Daughters of Joshua Cabe".

McVeagh was a regular on The Red Skelton Show for its last season. She also regularly performed in guest spots in Room 222 and McMillan & Wife. A favorite of Lucille Ball going back to I Love Lucy, she appeared with her on Here's Lucy. She guest starred in Love, American Style, and was featured in Little House on the Prairie, The Streets of San Francisco, The Virginian, The Bionic Woman, Charlie's Angels, The Jeffersons, Lou Grant, The Incredible Hulk, Knots Landing, Hill Street Blues, Hunter, and Airwolf. She rounded out the 1970s on a high note as socialite Helen Carrington in the 1979 critically acclaimed television movie Murder by Natural Causes with Hal Holbrook.

In the 1980s, her last decade in entertainment, McVeagh co-starred in an episode of Michael Landon's Highway to Heaven and was featured in two episodes of Simon & Simon. McVeagh guest starred in a 1985 episode of Cagney and Lacey as Dorothy Gantney, the grief-stricken mother of a murder victim in "The Psychic". McVeagh's last television credit was in 1987 as the guest star of the PBS show Square One TV as Mrs. Swaggle. Her career in television spanned 41 years.

Radio
 Photograph (right) was taken for "Let's Play Tennis Week" a charity event with stars of that era.

During the "Golden Age of Radio", McVeagh had several leading and supporting series roles and episodic leads in the 1940s and 1950s.  She played Mrs. Harriet Beatty on the "Clyde Beatty Show", and was a regular on "Broadway Is My Beat" and "Stars Over Hollywood". She starred in "Hollywood Hostages", an episode of "Suspense", as Grace.
McVeagh was a principal performer on "Jeff Regan, Investigator", Jack Webb's radio noir series. "McVeagh's ditzy—and sultry—characterizations were regularly featured" in the series.  She also played the lead in the role of convicted murderess Marie Lafarge in the 1953 episode of Crime Classics, "The Seven Layered Arsenic Cake of Madame Lafarge".  McVeagh appeared as the title character in the May 29, 1960 episode of "Gunsmoke" entitled "Bad Seed" and again in the January 29, 1961 episode entitled "Harriet".

Acting and voice coach
McVeagh was an acting and voice coach at the Film Actors Workshop at Warner Brothers Studios. Additionally, she taught privately and guest lectured at the University of Southern California in the School of Theatre.

Family life
McVeagh was married to character actor and director Clarke Gordon (her fourth husband) at the time of her death and had four children and nine grandchildren.

Death
Eve McVeagh Gordon died on December 10, 1997, from natural causes in Los Angeles. She was 78 years old.

Stage, Radio, Television and Film Credits

References

External links

 
 

1919 births
1997 deaths
American stage actresses
American radio actresses
American television actresses
American soap opera actresses
American film actresses
Actresses from Cincinnati
20th-century American actresses